Guzowy Piec  is a village in the administrative district of Gmina Gietrzwałd, within Olsztyn County, Warmian-Masurian Voivodeship, in northern Poland.

References

Guzowy Piec